Petroleum jelly, petrolatum, white petrolatum, soft paraffin, or multi-hydrocarbon, CAS number 8009-03-8, is a semi-solid mixture of hydrocarbons (with carbon numbers mainly higher than 25), originally promoted as a topical ointment for its healing properties. Vaseline has been a well known American brand of petroleum jelly since 1870.

After petroleum jelly became a medicine-chest staple, consumers began to use it for cosmetic purposes and for many ailments including toenail fungus, genital rashes (non-STI), nosebleeds, diaper rash, and common colds. Its folkloric medicinal value as a "cure-all" has since been limited by better scientific understanding of appropriate and inappropriate uses. It is recognized by the U.S. Food and Drug Administration (FDA) as an approved over-the-counter (OTC) skin protectant and remains widely used in cosmetic skin care, where it is often loosely referred to as mineral oil.

History 

Marco Polo in 1273 described the oil exportation of Baku oil by hundreds of camels and ships for burning and as an ointment for treating mange.

Native Americans discovered the use of petroleum jelly for protecting and healing skin. Sophisticated oil pits had been built as early as 1415–1450 in Western Pennsylvania. In 1859, workers operating the United States's first oil rigs noticed a paraffin-like material forming on rigs in the course of investigating malfunctions. Believing the substance hastened healing, the workers used the jelly on cuts and burns. 

Robert Chesebrough, a young chemist whose previous work of distilling fuel from the oil of sperm whales had been rendered obsolete by petroleum, went to Titusville, Pennsylvania, to see what new materials had commercial potential. Chesebrough took the unrefined green to gold colored rod wax, as the drillers called it, back to his laboratory to refine it and explore potential uses. He discovered that by distilling the lighter, thinner oil products from the rod wax, he could create a light-colored gel. The process involved vacuum distillation of the crude material followed by filtration of the still residue through bone char. Chesebrough traveled around New York demonstrating the product to encourage sales by burning his skin with acid or an open flame, then spreading the ointment on his injuries and showing his past injuries healed, he claimed, by his miracle product. He opened his first factory in 1870 in Brooklyn using the name Vaseline.

Physical properties 
Petroleum jelly is a mixture of hydrocarbons, with a melting point that depends on the exact proportions. It is flammable only when heated to liquid; then the fumes will light, not the liquid itself, so a wick material is needed to ignite petroleum jelly. It is colorless (or of a pale yellow color when not highly distilled), translucent, and devoid of taste and smell when pure. It does not oxidize on exposure to the air and is not readily acted on by chemical reagents. It is insoluble in water. It is soluble in dichloromethane, chloroform, benzene, diethyl ether, carbon disulfide and turpentine. Petroleum jelly is slightly soluble in alcohol. It acts as a plasticizer on polypropylene (PP), but is compatible with most other plastics. It is a semi-solid, in that it holds its shape indefinitely like a solid, but it can be forced to take the shape of its container without breaking apart, like a liquid, though it does not flow on its own.

Depending on the specific application of petroleum jelly, it may be USP, B.P., or Ph. Eur. grade. This pertains to the processing and handling of the petroleum jelly so it is suitable for medicinal and personal-care applications.

Uses 
Most uses of petroleum jelly exploit its lubricating and coating properties, including use on dry lips and dry skin. Below are some examples of the uses of petroleum jelly.

Medical treatment 
Vaseline brand First Aid Petroleum Jelly, or carbolated petroleum jelly containing phenol to give the jelly additional antibacterial effect, has been discontinued. During World War II, a variety of petroleum jelly called red veterinary petrolatum, or Red Vet Pet for short, was often included in life raft survival kits. Acting as a sunscreen, it provides protection against ultraviolet rays.

The American Academy of Dermatology recommends keeping skin injuries moist with petroleum jelly to reduce scarring. A verified medicinal use is to protect and prevent moisture loss of the skin of a patient in the initial post-operative period following laser skin resurfacing.

Petroleum jelly is used extensively by otolaryngologists—ear, nose, and throat surgeons—for nasal moisture and epistaxis treatment, and to combat nasal crusting. Large studies have found petroleum jelly applied to the nose for short durations to have no significant side effects.

Historically, it was also consumed for internal use and even promoted as "Vaseline confection".

Skin and hair care 
Most petroleum jelly today is used as an ingredient in skin lotions and cosmetics, providing various types of skin care and protection by minimizing friction or reducing moisture loss, or by functioning as a grooming aid (e.g., pomade). It is also used for treating dry scalp and dandruff.

Preventing moisture loss 
By reducing the loss of moisture via transepidermal water loss, petroleum jelly can prevent chapped hands and lips, and soften nail cuticles.

This property is exploited to provide heat insulation: petroleum jelly can be used to keep swimmers warm in water when training, or during channel crossings or long ocean swims. It can prevent chilling of the face due to evaporation of skin moisture during cold weather outdoor sports.

Hair grooming 
In the first part of the twentieth century, petroleum jelly, either pure or as an ingredient, was also popular as a hair pomade. When used in a 50/50 mixture with pure beeswax, it makes an effective moustache wax.

Skin lubrication 
Petroleum jelly can be used to reduce the friction between skin and clothing during various sport activities, for example to prevent chafing of the seat region of cyclists, or the nipples of long distance runners wearing loose T-shirts, and is commonly used in the groin area of wrestlers and footballers.

Petroleum jelly is commonly used as a personal lubricant, because it does not dry out like water-based lubricants, and has a distinctive "feel", different from that of K-Y and related methylcellulose products. However, it is not recommended for use with condoms during sexual activity, as it increases the chance of rupture.

Product care and protection

Coating 
Petroleum jelly can be used to coat corrosion-prone items such as metallic trinkets, non-stainless steel blades, and gun barrels prior to storage as it serves as an excellent and inexpensive water repellent. It is used as an environmentally friendly underwater antifouling coating for motor boats and sailing yachts. It was recommended in the Porsche owner's manual as a preservative for light alloy (alleny) anodized Fuchs wheels to protect them against corrosion from road salts and brake dust.

Finishing 
It can be used to finish and protect wood, much like a mineral oil finish. It is used to condition and protect smooth leather products like bicycle saddles, boots, motorcycle clothing, and used to put a shine on patent leather shoes (when applied in a thin coat and then gently buffed off).

Lubrication 
Petroleum jelly can be used to lubricate zippers and slide rules. It was also recommended by Porsche in maintenance training documentation for lubrication (after cleaning) of "Weatherstrips on Doors, Hood, Tailgate, Sun Roof". It is used in bullet lubricant compounds. Petrolatum is also used as a light lubricating grease as well as an anti-seize assembling grease.

Industrial production processes 
Petroleum jelly is a useful material when incorporated into candle wax formulas. It softens the overall blend, allows the candle to incorporate additional fragrance oil, and facilitates adhesion to the sidewall of the glass. Petroleum jelly is used to moisten nondrying modelling clay such as plasticine, as part of a mix of hydrocarbons including those with greater (paraffin wax) and lesser (mineral oil) molecular weights. It is used as a tack reducer additive to printing inks to reduce paper lint "picking" from uncalendered paper stocks. It can be used as a release agent for plaster molds and castings. It is used in the leather industry as a waterproofing cream.

Other

Explosives
Petroleum jelly can be mixed with a high proportion of strong inorganic chlorates due to it acting as a plasticizer and a fuel source. An example of this is Cheddite C which consists of a ratio of 9:1, KClO3 to petroleum jelly. This mixture is unable to detonate without the use of a blasting cap. It is also used as a stabiliser in the manufacture of the propellant Cordite.

Mechanical, barrier functions 
Petroleum jelly can be used to fill copper or fibre-optic cables using plastic insulation to prevent the ingress of water, see icky-pick. 

Petroleum jelly can be used to coat the inner walls of terrariums to prevent animals crawling out and escaping.

A stripe of petroleum jelly can be used to prevent the spread of a liquid. For example, it can be applied close to the hairline when using a home hair dye kit to prevent the hair dye from irritating or staining the skin. It is also used to prevent diaper rash.

Petroleum jelly is sometimes used to protect the terminals on batteries. In automobiles, a silicone-based battery grease provides better protection as it is less likely to melt.

Surface cleansing 
Petroleum jelly is used to gently clean a variety of surfaces, ranging from makeup removal from faces to tar stain removal from leather.

Pet care 
Petroleum jelly is used to moisturize the paws of dogs. It is a common ingredient in hairball remedies for domestic cats.

Health 
A study published in 2017 found at most 1% Mineral Oil Aromatic Hydrocarbons (MOAH) in petroleum jelly, and less than 1% in petroleum jelly-based beauty products.

The European Food Safety Authority sees MOAH and polyaromatics as possibly carcinogenic.

Earlier in 2015, German consumer watchdog Stiftung Warentest analyzed cosmetics containing mineral oils. It found high concentrations of Mineral Oil Aromatic Hydrocarbons (MOAH) and even polyaromatics in products containing mineral oils. Vaseline products contained the most MOAH of all tested cosmetics (up to 9%).  Based on the 2015 results, Stiftung Warentest warns not to use Vaseline or any product that is based on mineral oils for lip care.

References

External links 

Test methods for petroleum jelly
Typical specifications of petroleum jelly when blended with vegetable based oils
Specific in vitro toxicity of crude and refined petroleum products: II. Estrogen (alpha and beta) and androgen receptor-mediated responses in yeast assays.

Petroleum products
Cosmetics chemicals
Personal lubricants
Amorphous solids
Dosage forms
American inventions